Permanent Record may refer to:

 Permanent Record (autobiography), 2019 autobiography by Edward Snowden
 Permanent Record (novel), 2019 young adult novel by Mary H.K. Choi
 Permanent Record (film), 1988 American drama
Permanent Record: Al in the Box, a four-disc compilation boxed set by "Weird Al" Yankovic
Permanent Record: Live & Otherwise, 2005 live concert DVD by the Violent Femmes
Permanent Record: The Very Best of Violent Femmes, 2005 greatest hits album by the Violent Femmes
A term for a student's school transcript